The UCI Mountain Bike World Cup is a multi-round mountain bike racing series that is sanctioned by the Union Cycliste Internationale. The first World Cup series – which was composed of cross-country events – was held in 1989. The Downhill World Cup was inaugurated two years later, and the Dual Slalom World Cup was launched in 1998. The dual-slalom format – which involved knock-out heats with two riders on the parallel courses in each heat – evolved into four-cross (with four riders on a single course per heat) in 2002 before being dropped after the 2011 season. Riders win points according to their placing in each event. The reigning series leaders in each class are identified by a special jersey. The UCI Mountain Bike World Cup is broadcast live and globally on Red Bull TV.

The replacement world series for 4X World Cup is the 4X Pro Tour and for XCM World Cup is UCI MTB Marathon series.

Overall series winners

Cross-country (XCO)

Men 

 Medals:

Women 

 Medals:

Cross-country time-trial

Men

Women

Marathon (XCM)

Men

Women

Downhill (DH)

Men

Women

Junior Men

Dual-slalom

Men

Women

Four-cross (4X)

Men

Women

References

External links 

 UCI Mountain Bike World Cup

 
Mountain Bike World Cup
Mountain biking events
Recurring sporting events established in 1991